The Brigham Young Winter Home and Office is a historic residence and museum located in St. George, Utah. Brigham Young was the foremost Mormon pioneer and second president of the Church of Jesus Christ of Latter-day Saints (LDS Church), who led its members to the Utah Territory. As Young grew older, his arthritis precluded him from spending winters in the Salt Lake City region, so a winter home in St. George, in the arid Dixie region of Utah, was built for him. Young seasonally occupied the home and office from 1873 to 1876. The building was eventually deeded to the division of Utah State Parks and Recreation; it is now open as a museum where missionaries of the Church provide guided tours.

History

Brigham Young was a tradesman from Whitingham, Vermont who converted to the LDS Church in 1830. He joined with Joseph Smith, founder of the Latter Day Saint movement, in 1832 and moved the church's headquarters to Kirtland, Ohio. After the church relocated to Nauvoo, Illinois, Smith named Young to the first Quorum of the Twelve Apostles and then, in 1839, as the quorum president. In 1844, the residents of Nauvoo were split over the issue of plural marriage, leading to the arrest of Smith. A mob of men killed Smith while he was in Carthage Jail, resulting in the succession crisis.

By the time Young became church president, tensions between the Mormons in Nauvoo and non-Mormons in nearby settlements was at a peak. In early 1846, Young left with most of the Latter-day Saints and headed west to establish a new settlement, away from persecution. When he arrived at the base of the Salt Lake Valley, he decided to create a permanent settlement, Salt Lake City. Young assigned groups of Latter-day Saints to settle nearby territories and communities, convert the natives, and provide infrastructure.

St. George was a commissioned settlement in Utah's Dixie. Intended to be a cotton-growing colony, the region was noted for its warm temperatures, even in winter. As Young aged, he found that warm weather helped his arthritis. St. George settlers built a home and office for Young in 1871, and he frequently spent his winters there after a front extension was added in 1873. Young's presence motivated the locals to complete the St. George Temple, which Young himself dedicated in 1877. Young died on August 29, 1877, and willed the land to Judd Gates, the local dentist. It was later abandoned until Georgius Cannon Young, a descendant of Brigham, purchased the lot and restored it. He deeded it to Utah State Parks and Recreation in 1959 and the house was again restored.

The house and office was designed by Miles Romney. An 1873 addition was designed by his son, Miles Park Romney. The house stands at two stories and is constructed with beige adobe brick. The red sandstone basement has two rooms, and the roof gable has wood shingles. Inside, the house has four fireplaces, three made of red sandstone and one from adobe. The church relocated all of Young's existing former furniture, some of which was built by Young himself, and added other period pieces to replace those lost. The office is east of the living quarters, featuring stucco walls and a sandstone chimney. Wood for the house was cut from the Mount Trumbull Wilderness and the Pine Valley Mountain Wilderness.

The Brigham Young Winter Home and Office was added to the National Register of Historic Places in 1971. It is located at the southeast corner of 100 West and 200 North and is open to the public as a museum.

See also

 National Register of Historic Places in Washington County, Utah

References

External links

 Utah.com: Brigham Young Winter Home
 
 

National Register of Historic Places in Washington County, Utah
Houses on the National Register of Historic Places in Utah
Historic house museums in Utah
Brigham Young
Museums in Washington County, Utah
Buildings and structures in St. George, Utah
1871 establishments in Utah Territory
Historic American Buildings Survey in Utah
Houses in Washington County, Utah